Cheiloceras is a subglobular to thickly lenticular goniatite with a closed umbilicus from the Upper Devonian and type genus for the Cheiloceratidae.
 
Cheiloceras is sometimes split into at least three subgenera. Cheiloceras (Cheiloceras) has evolute juvenile stages, the umbilicus closing later, while C. (Compactoceras) is subglobular with involute whorls in the early stage, later becoming compressed in form, and C. (Puncticeras) is involute in all stages. Eucheiloceras is another name for C. (Cheiloceras).

Related genera in the Cheiloceratidae include Staffites and  Dyscheiloceras.

References

Ammonites of Africa
Ammonites of Australia
Late Devonian ammonites
Goniatitida genera
Cheiloceratidae